The Woodsman is a 2004 American drama film directed and co-written (with Steven Fechter) by Nicole Kassell, based on Fechter's play of the same name. The film stars Kevin Bacon as a convicted child molester who must adjust to life after prison. Its name refers to the woodsman from the fairy tale of Little Red Riding Hood who kills the wolf to save the titular child.

Plot
Walter, a convicted child molester, returns home to Philadelphia after serving 12 years in prison. His friends and family have abandoned him, with the exception of his brother-in-law, Carlos. Walter's apartment is just across the street from an elementary school—an obvious source of temptation. He gets a job at a local lumber mill and meets Vicki, one of the few women working there. After sleeping with Vicki, Walter tells her that he molested little girls, but rationalizes his crimes by saying "I didn't hurt them." Vicki is clearly shocked and disturbed by this new information, but before she can consider how to respond, Walter tells her to leave his apartment.

Walter receives frequent visits from a verbally abusive police officer named Lucas, who makes it clear that he is waiting to catch Walter reoffending. Watching the school, Walter sees a man offering candy to little boys. He realizes that this man, whom he nicknames "Candy", is another child molester. Walter also meets an apparently lonely young girl named Robin who is a birdwatcher. Walter sees Candy abduct a boy, but does not report this to the police. Walter's life takes a further downturn when a suspicious coworker, Mary-Kay, learns of his conviction. She prints out his police record and posts it on the bulletin board at the mill for everybody to see. Some of the employees attack Walter, but Vicki and the boss of the mill come to his defense.

Ostracized and frustrated, Walter leaves his workplace and goes to the park. Vicki, fearing the worst, begins to search for him. Walter ends up meeting with Robin at the park. As they talk, he begins to succumb to his desires and invites Robin to sit on his lap. She politely refuses, but then begins to confide in him. As she starts to cry, Walter realizes that she is being molested by her father. In her anguish, and sensing a similarity between her father and Walter, she offers to sit on Walter's lap, wanting his approval. Walter finally understands the pain he caused his victims, and tells Robin to go home; as she leaves, she gives him a hug. On his way home, he sees Candy dropping off a young boy near the school at night. In a fit of rage and self-hatred, Walter beats Candy up. He then goes to Vicki's home, and she accepts him.

Soon after, Lucas visits Walter's apartment as Walter is packing to move in with Vicki and tells him that a man was beaten across the street the night before, and asks if he knows anything about it. Walter denies any knowledge, but Lucas knows better. He reveals that the boy gave a very good description of the assailant, which fits Walter. He also reveals that "Candy" is wanted in Virginia for raping a young boy. Lucas decides not to charge Walter with the assault.

With Carlos' help, Walter is reunited with his sister, whom he has not seen in years. However, she refuses to forgive him and leaves. In a voice-over discussion in which his therapist tells him that eventual forgiveness may take years, Walter replies that he understands and accepts her anger, and expresses optimism for his own future.

Cast

Production
After seeing Steven Fechter's stage play The Woodsman as a film school student, Nicole Kassell became determined to adapt it into a film. Kassell and Fechter adapted the screenplay together, making it a "less talky, more internalized character study of a haunted man struggling to build a normal life." Lee Daniels, who was a producer on the Oscar-winning film Monster's Ball, came on board as a producer. Kevin Bacon, besides starring in the film, was one of the producers as well. For research, Kassell interviewed sex offenders and therapists who worked with them. 

The Woodsman was shot in Philadelphia, which is the hometown of cast members Bacon and Eve, as well as the birthplace of director Kassell and producer Daniels.

Reception
The film was well-received critically, with Bacon's performance in particular drawing praise. Rotten Tomatoes reported that 88% of critics gave the film a positive review based on 133 reviews with an average rating of 7.30/10 with the consensus "Kevin Bacon's performance as a child molester who is trying to start fresh has drawn raves from critics, who have praised The Woodsman as compelling, creepy, complex and well-crafted." The film has a score of 72 on Metacritic based on 34 reviews. It was nominated for the Grand Jury Prize award at the 2004 Sundance Film Festival, won the Jury Special Prize at the Deauville Film Festival, and was a featured film at the 2005 Traverse City Film Festival.

The film's release in the United States was limited, reaching a peak of 84 theaters. Despite being advertised in cinemas in the UK for several months, the film had a very limited release in the UK due to its controversial subject matter. Its gross in the United States was $1,576,231, while its worldwide gross totaled $4,678,405. In an interview with The New York Times in 2010, actor Colin Firth named Bacon's performance the Best of the Decade.

Awards and nominations

Home media 
The film was released on VHS and DVD on April 12, 2005 by Columbia TriStar Home Entertainment.

See also 
The Hunt (2012 film)

References

External links
 
 
 

2004 films
2004 drama films
2004 independent films
American drama films
Films about atonement
Films about child sexual abuse
Films about pedophilia
American films based on plays
Films set in Philadelphia
Films shot in Philadelphia
2004 directorial debut films
2000s English-language films
Films directed by Nicole Kassell
2000s American films